Marbella Parapente SL was a Spanish aircraft manufacturer based in Málaga and founded by Pierre Aubert. The company specialized in the design and manufacture of paramotors in the form of ready-to-fly aircraft for the US FAR 103 Ultralight Vehicles rules and the European microlight category.

The company seems to have been founded before 1998 and gone out of business in March 2005.

The company was a Sociedad de Responsabilidad Limitada, a Spanish limited liability company.

Marbella Parapente produced the PAP family of paramotors that were noted for such details as incorporating the reserve parachute within the frame structure.

PAP series paramotors were flown to first-place finishes in the world championships in 2001, 2002, 2003 and 2004.

Pilot Ramon Morillas set a world record in June 1998, flying a PAP paramotor across Spain from the southwest to the northeast over a distance of  covered in about 11.5 hours.

Aircraft

References

External links
Company website archives on Archive.org

Defunct aircraft manufacturers of Spain
Ultralight aircraft
Powered parachutes
Paramotors
Companies of Andalusia
Málaga